David Leon is an actor.

David Leon may also refer to:
David Leon (soccer) (born 1987), American soccer player
David ben Judah Messer Leon (c. 1470–c. 1526), Italian rabbi, physician and writer
David Ari Leon (born 1967), American composer, musician and music supervisor

See also
Léon David, French tenor